Tarlton may refer to:

Places
 Tarlton, Gauteng, a settlement in South Africa
 Tarlton, Gloucestershire, a location in England
 Tarlton, Ohio, United States
 Tarlton International Raceway

People

Given name
 Tarlton Rayment (1882-1964), Australian artist, author, broadcaster, poet, naturalist, entomologist and beekeeper

Surname
 Donald K. Tarlton (born 1943), Canadian entertainment businessman
 Richard Tarlton (1530-1588), English actor

See also
 Tarleton, a village in Lancashire, England
 Tarleton (surname)